Shoʻrsuv is an urban-type settlement in Fergana Region, Uzbekistan. It is part of Uzbekistan District. The town population was 2,332 people in 1989, and 2,400 in 2016.

References

Populated places in Fergana Region
Urban-type settlements in Uzbekistan